Baksila is a village and village development committee  in Khotang District in the Sagarmatha Zone of eastern Nepal. At the time of the 1991 Nepal census it had a population of 3,996 persons living in 796 individual households. Baksila is a five hours walk from Diktel, headquarters of Khotang District. Surrounded by Baspani, Sungdel, Dipsung, Rakha Saptewor and Kharmi, the village is split into nine wards geographically. It became the headquarters of Kepilasgadhi rural municipality after the local level division in line with the constitution and local level election. It is ward number 4 of Kepilasgadhi RM and Ganesh Bahadur Adhikari is the chairperson of ward. Shree Prithvi Higher Secondary School, Local Buddha Bajar, Kepilasgadhi, etc. are the main places/offices.

References

External links
UN map of the municipalities of Khotang District

Populated places in Khotang District